Pablo A. Parrilo from MIT (Massachusetts Institute of Technology) was named Fellow of the Institute of Electrical and Electronics Engineers (IEEE) in 2016 for contributions to semidefinite and sum-of-squares optimization. He was named a SIAM Fellow in 2018.

References 

Fellow Members of the IEEE
Fellows of the Society for Industrial and Applied Mathematics
Living people
Massachusetts Institute of Technology faculty
21st-century American engineers
Year of birth missing (living people)